Sanok  (in full the Royal Free City of Sanok — , , Sanok, Sianok or Sianik, Sonik) is a town in the Subcarpathian Voivodeship of south-eastern Poland with 38,397 inhabitants, as of June 2016. Located on the San River and around 52 km south of Przemyśl, Sanok lies directly by the Carpathian Mountains.

Once settled by Poles, Jews and Lemkos, the town's history goes back almost 1000 years when it was part of a medieval trade route. The Museum of Folk Architecture as well as the refurbished Sanok Castle and Old Town are popular points of interest. The region also features a 70 km trail for hikers and cyclists.

Geography
The city of Sanok is the capital of Sanok County in the Subcarpathian Voivodeship in Poland. Previously, it was in the Krosno Voivodeship (1975–1998) and in the Ruthenian Voivodeship (1340–1772), which was part of the Red Ruthenia region, and in wider sense, of the Lesser Poland Province of the Polish Crown (not of Lesser Poland proper). Historically, it was part of the Land of Sanok.

This historic city is situated on the San River at the foot of Castle Hill in the Lesser Poland (Małopolska) region. It lies in a wooded, hilly area near the national road number 28, which runs along southern Poland, from Ustrzyki Dolne to Wadowice ( away).

Sanok is located on the bank of the river San. The area surrounding mountain range stretches between the Wisłok, Osława and San Rivers in the Salt Mountains (Central Beskidian Piedmont), in the inland with temperateness climate. The hills of the Bieszczady mountain range are typical for this countryside.  Sanok County is bordered by Krosno County to the west, Brzozów County to the north, Przemyśl County to the north-east and Lesko County to the east. It also borders Slovakia to the south. 
Before World War II, the Oslawa and San Rivers line was designated the wild frontier between Poles and Lemkos.

The city is a member of Carpathian Euroregion, which is designed to bring together the people who inhabit the region of the Carpathian Mountains and to facilitate their cooperation in the fields of science, culture, education, trade, tourism and economy.

History

In 981, Sanok along with several other Cherven gords, then inhabited by the Slavic tribe of Lendians, was made a part of Red Ruthenia, when Vladimir I of Kiev invaded the area and took it over from Poland. In 1018, the settlement along with the surrounding region returned to Poland, and in 1031, was again recaptured by Rus'. In 1339, the town was given the Magdeburg law by Boleslaw-Yuri II of Galicia.

Sanok was mentioned in the Ruthenian Hypatian Codex chronicle, where one can read that in the year 1150: The Hungarian King Géza II of Hungary crossed the mountains and seized the stronghold of Sanok with its governor as well as many villages in the Przemyśl area. The same chronicle refers to Sanok twice more, stating that in 1205 it was the meeting place of a Ruthenian princess Anna and a Hungarian king, and that in 1231 a Ruthenian prince made an expedition to "Sanok - Hungarian Gate".

During the Galicia–Volhynia Wars, Sanok was seized by King Casimir III of Poland, who reconfirmed its municipal status on 25 April 1366, and made it a royal city of the Polish Crown. At that time Sanok became the centre of a new administrative district called Sanok Land, a part of the Ruthenian Voivodeship. Several courts of justice operated in the town, including the municipal and rural courts of lower instance and also the higher instance court for the entire Sanok Land, based on the German town law. Germans settled in the territory of the Kingdom of Poland (territory of present-day Subcarpathian Voivodeship) from the 14th to 16th centuries (see Ostsiedlung), mostly after the region returned to Poland in 1340, when Casimir III of Poland took the Czerwień towns.

Marcin Bielski states that Bolesław I the Brave had settled some Germans in the region to defend the borders against Hungary and Kievan Rus', who later turned to farming. Maciej Stryjkowski mentions German peasants near Przeworsk, Przemyśl, Sanok, and Jarosław, describing them as good farmers. The region was also traditionally inhabited by subgroups of the Rusyn people: Lemkos and Boykos.

As early at the 17th century, an important trade route went across Sanok connecting the interior of Hungary with Poland through the Łupków Pass. As a result of the First Partition of Poland (Treaty of St-Petersburg dated 5 July 1772, Sanok was attributed to the Habsburg monarchy. At that time the area (including west and east of Subcarpathian Voivodship) became known as the Galicia province. For more details, see the article Kingdom of Galicia and Lodomeria.

In the mid-18th century, 47.7% of the town's population was Roman Catholic (Polish), 36.4% Jewish, and 14.7% Greek Catholic (Ruthenian).

The Galician peasant revolt took place in the region during the revolutions of 1848.

The course of the river Dunajec and that of the San, both in West Galicia, marked the two successive stages in the breakthrough battle which initiated the Austro-German offensive of 1915 on the eastern front. An attempt to hold the line of the Wisłok river and the Łupków Pass failed before renewed Austro-German attacks on 8 May 1915. Wisłok Valley was one of the strategically important Carpathian rivers bitterly contested in battles on the Eastern Front of World War I during the winter of 1914–1915.

During World War I, the Russian army occupied the town from May until July, 1915 and significantly damaged the town. The town was subsequently occupied by troops of the Austro-Hungarian Empire.

In 1918 Poland regained independence and control of the town and within the interwar Second Polish Republic it was the seat of the Sanok County in the Lwów Voivodeship. Sanok was known as a centre of Ukrainian movement in Galicia, and of cultural heritage of the Lemkos and other Rusyns.

The Jewish population of Sanok may have been almost 30% for many years in the early 20th century. During the joint German–Soviet invasion of Poland, which started World War II, in September 1939, it was invaded by Germany, and the Einsatzgruppe I entered the town on September 25, 1939 to commit various atrocities against the populace. In 1939–1940, the Germans imprisoned many Poles in the local prison, especially those who tried to escape occupation to take refuge in Hungary. The Germans then massacred 112 Poles at the Gruszka mountain near Tarnawa Dolna. The victims are buried at the Central Cemetery in Sanok. At the beginning of the German occupation during World War II, the Jewish population was around 5,000. During the occupation, most of the Jews were either executed or killed in Nazi death camps or Nazi concentration camps during the Holocaust. Some of the actions against the Jews were assisted by Ukrainian auxiliaries and hundreds of the deaths occurred in Sanok itself, while the Polish resistance movement established the secret Polish Council to Aid Jews "Żegota", which operated in the town. Buildings that had been owned by Jews were taken by the local population.  The local Jewish cemetery still exists. Several hundred Jews are thought to have survived, most of whom fled to the Soviet Union at the beginning of the war. Some of the Jews emigrated to Canada and the United States in the early 1900s with Sanoker Burial Societies spreading throughout New York and other regions where they settled.

In 1943 the foundation of the Waffen-SS Division Galizien took place in heavily Ukrainian-populated Sanok, with many locals volunteering in the ethnic Ukrainian Waffen-SS. Because of material support and assistance provided by the Ukrainian minority to the Ukrainian Insurgent Army, which was waging a battle for Ukrainian separatism against the Polish state, new Soviet-installed communist authorities deported the Ukrainian and Lemko population of Sanok and its region to the Recovered Territories attached to Poland after World War II during Operation Vistula (1946–1947). Some of the Lemkos expelled returned to Sanok in 1957-58 and others after 1989.
 
Sanok contains an open-air museum called a skansen in the Biała Góra district, where examples of architecture from all of the region's main ethnic groups have been moved and carefully reassembled in a skansen evoking everyday rural life in the 19th century.

Archaeology

Settled in prehistoric times, the south-eastern Poland region that is now Subcarpathia was overrun in pre-Roman times by various tribes, including the Celts (Anarti), Goths and Vandals (Przeworsk culture and Púchov culture). In the Middle Ages, the area was inhabited by the Polish tribe of Lendians, and the area was also invaded by Hungarians, before it eventually became part of the emerging Polish state in the 10th century.

The region subsequently became part of the Great Moravian state. Upon the invasion of the Hungarian tribes into the heart of the Great Moravian Empire around 899, the Lendians of the area declared their allegiance to Hungarian Empire. The region then became a site of contention between Poland, Kievan Rus' and Hungary starting in at least the 9th century.

The first traces of settlement in the area of modern Sanok date back to at least the 9th century. The following century a Slavic fortified town (gord) was created there and initially served as a center of pagan worship. The etymology of the name is unclear, though most scholars derive it from the Celtic river-name San. Certain archaeological excavations performed on the castle hill and on Fajka hill near Sanok-Trepcza, not only confirm the written resources, but date the Sanok stronghold origin to as early as the 9th century. On Fajka hill, where probably the first settlement of Sanok was situated, some remains of an ancient sanctuary and a cemetery were found, as well as numerous decorations and encolpions in Kievan type. Also found were two seals of the Great Kievan Prince Rurik Rostislavich from the second half of the 12th century.

Sights

 Skansen in Sanok - detailed houses, churches, cerkiews (Orthodox/Uniate churches of Lemkos, Boykos etc.)
 Sanok castle and Icon collection - one of the largest collections of this in Central and Eastern Europe.
 Town square/Rynek
 Parish Church dating to the 19th century
 Franciscan Church dating to the 14th century.
Near the central town square and the previous Jewish ghetto, there is a valley where much of the Jewish population was murdered en masse by the Nazis during the Holocaust.

Economy

Sanok has a strong industry base - home to Stomil Sanok (established in 1932) and Pass Gummiwerke plants, producers of various rubber and metal-rubber seals, strings and laggings for automotive sector, construction industries and electrical household goods sector, PGNiG and Sanok Bus Car Factory "Autosan" (established in 1832), a producer of high capacity buses, cabins for the Polish Army and bodies for rail-vehicles. Stomil is next to the main train station in Sanok and Autosan is a 10-minute walk from the station, while the town centre is a 15-minute walk in the other direction.

Culture and education

The town has several public schools and a branch of the Polish High School of Technology. The town also has a football club called Stal Sanok and some other sport clubs (including volleyball, swimming, handball, ice hockey). The Sanok Castle near the centre of the old town houses a museum displaying over 300 fine icons. The Museum of Folk Architecture is one of the biggest open-air museums in Poland and show cases 19th and early 20th century life in this area of Poland.

Sport
The city has two professional sports teams. The local ice hockey team is STS Sanok, which has won the Polska Hokej Liga league title twice, in the 2011/2012 and 2013/2014 season. They won the Polish Cup twice, in 2010-11 and 2011–12. The local football club is Stal Sanok, which competes in the lower leagues.

There many sports facilities in Sanok and the main complex of those facilities is The Civic Sports and Recreation Centre, situated near the San River. The Centre includes: the artificial speed skating oval Tor Błonie, a complex of indoor and outdoor swimming pools, a hotel, a tourist hostel, a camp-site, a sports stadium with technical facilities, etc. There is also another artificial ice rink in the centre of the town, designed for ice hockey and managed by the ice hockey club STS Sanok. There are two more sports facilities at Stróżowska street: a stadium of sports club Stal Sanok, and a gymnasium of the Technical Schools Complex.

In winter, a ski-lift operates in the nearby Karlików.

Notable people
Katarzyna Bachleda-Curuś (born 1980), speed skater
Tomasz Beksiński (1958–1999), radio presenter
Zdzisław Beksiński (1929–2005), painter, photographer, sculptor
Adam Fastnacht (1913–1987), Polish historian
Jan Grodek (?–1554), nine-time rector of Jagiellonian University
Szlomo Halberstam (1847–1905), first Bobover Rebbe
Mikołaj Kamieniecki(1460–1515), nobleman 
Juliusz Kühl (1913–1985), Polish diplomat
Piotr Michalski (born 1994), speed skater
Jerzy Mniszech (c. 1548–1613), nobleman
Ryszard Pacławski (born 1958), lawyer
Marian Pankowski (1919–2011), resistance fighter of World War II
Zdzisław Peszkowski (1918–2007), survivor of the Katyn massacre 
Majer Szapira (1887–1933), first Orthodox Jew to become a member in the Sejm (Parliament)
Kazimierz Świtalski (1886–1962), politician and diplomat 
Tadeusz Vetulani (1897–1952),  agriculturalist and biologist
Frank-Wojnarowski (1921–1966), American Polish Orchestra leader 
Janusz Szuber (1947 - 2020), Poet, Author, Journalist

Demographics

In the mid-18th century, Roman Catholics constituted 48.7% of the population, people of Jewish faith 36.5%, and 14.7% of the inhabitants belonged to the Greek Catholic Church.

In 1900, the town had 6123 inhabitants, 57% Polish, 30% Jewish, and the remainder of various Rusyn ethnicities (Boyko, Lemkos, etc.), and others. The town's large population of Jews were almost all murdered during the Holocaust.
Ethnic Groups
Poles

See also
 Folk Dance Ensemble Sanok
 The Petroleum Trail International Tourist Trail

References

External links

 Królewskie Wolne Miasto Sanok, official website
 Webcam
 Szpital Specjalistyczny w Sanoku
 Sanok at KehilaLinks
 

 
Cities and towns in Podkarpackie Voivodeship
Sanok County
Ruthenian Voivodeship
Kingdom of Galicia and Lodomeria
Lwów Voivodeship
Magdeburg rights
Holocaust locations in Poland